Lawrence Joseph Campbell (born November 29, 1970) is an American actor and comedian best known for his role as Andy on the ABC sitcom According to Jim.

Early life
Born in Cadillac, Michigan, Campbell graduated from high school at Pine River Area Schools and received a Bachelor of Applied Arts in theater at Central Michigan University and a Master of Arts in theater at Wayne State University. In 2005, Campbell returned to Central Michigan University to serve as the grand marshal of the homecoming parade.

Career

His first high-profile TV guest star role probably was as "The Fan" in a February 2000 episode of Friends (season 6, episode 14). The next year, he was cast as Andy on According to Jim. He has also appeared in movies including Wedding Crashers and Showtime, and in commercials including Ball Park hot dog commercials as "Frank," and a PSA for the V-chip on ABC, as Jim'''s Andy. In 2007, he appeared in two episodes of My Name Is Earl as Ron, a security prison guard. Campbell also played Detective Crockers in the 2007 horror film Drive-Thru. That same year, he made a guest appearance on Supernatural (episode: "Bedtime Stories").

Campbell had a small role on Showtime's Weeds. Larry also appeared as Pete Denham in the 2010 film Killers and as Vigs in Deadrise. Also, he appeared in the Disney Channel shows I Didn't Do It as Deputy Doug, Good Luck Charlie as Hugo, Dog with a Blog as "The Hawk", Best Friends Whenever as Mr. Doyle, and CBS' The New Adventures of Old Christine and Rules of Engagement. Campbell played the role of Hog Head in the 2011 film Hall Pass.
He had a recurring role in the series The Protector.  In 2013, he began touring with a group of comedians led by his Jim co-star Jim Belushi known as "Jim Belushi and the Board of Comedy".

In 2017, Campbell had a recurring role as Chief Engineer Newton in the first season of the Fox sci-fi TV series The Orville. At the end of that season, his character was written out. That same year, he had a recurring role as a step-father to a troubled high schooler in the Netflix documentary American Vandal, and appeared in an episode of the sitcom American Housewife. In 2019, he appeared as Officer Wilson in the HBO drama series Euphoria.

Personal life and family
Campbell's wife, Peggy, teaches at the Rolling Hills Country Day School in Rolling Hills Estates, California. The couple have five children.

Filmography

Film

Television

References

Sources
 Heidi Press, "Alumni Profile: According to Larry" Wayne State: The Magazine for Members of the WSU Alumni Association'' (Detroit) Fall 2006, p. 33

External links
 

1970 births
Male actors from Michigan
American male television actors
Central Michigan University alumni
Living people
Wayne State University alumni